Whore, also known as The Life, (Spanish title: Yo puta "I, whore") is a 2004 film directed by María Lidón and starring Daryl Hannah, Denise Richards, and Joaquim de Almeida. It is based on the 2003 book Yo puta by Isabel Pisano.

Main cast
 Daryl Hannah – Adriana
 Denise Richards – Rebecca
 Joaquim de Almeida – Pierre

See also
 List of Spanish films of 2004

External links
 
 
 

2004 films
2004 drama films
English-language Spanish films
Films about prostitution in Spain
Films based on novels
Spanish drama films
Films scored by Javier Navarrete
2000s English-language films
2000s Spanish films